Mount Lawley Senior High School is a public co-educational high day school in the City of Stirling, located in Mount Lawley, a northern suburb of Perth, Western Australia. The school consists of three separate sub-schools: Middle School for Years 7 and 8, Upper School for Years 9 and 10 and Senior School for Years 11 and 12.

House system
Mount Lawley has four houses, named after notable Western Australians: Hackett (green), Forrest (red), Murdoch (blue) and O'Connor (yellow).

Notable alumni

 Ben Glatzer, sound engineer and producer
 Marcus Graham, actor
 David Helfgott, pianist
 Tammy MacIntosh, actress
 Dacre Montgomery, actor and poet
 Jeff Newman, television presenter
 Kevin Penkin, anime and video game music composer
 Sam Powell-Pepper, professional Australian rules footballer
 Jaye Radisich,  politician
 Nikita Rukavytsya, professional footballer
 James Smillie, actor and singer
 Graeme Snooks, systems theorist and stratologist
 Katy Steele, singer, guitarist and songwriter
 Luke Steele, member of the electronic music duo Empire of the Sun
 Ken Travers, politician

See also

 List of schools in the Perth metropolitan area

References

External links
 Mount Lawley Senior High School website
 Mount Lawley Senior High School Parents and Citizens' Association website
 Mount Lawley Senior High School Alumni (since 1955)

1955 establishments in Australia
Educational institutions established in 1955
Public high schools in Perth, Western Australia
Mount Lawley, Western Australia